Tim Wilson (born 12 May 1961) is an English animator and former politician. In 2015, he was selected as South Northamptonshire's candidate for the UK Independence Party, but stood down due to disagreeing with racist comments made by party members. In 2019, he finished in third place in the second series of the Channel 4 series The Circle, and also produces videos for Zontul Films Ltd's YouTube channel.

Background
Wilson attended Ratcliffe College and Oxford University where he studied Theology in St Benet's Hall under Metropolitan Bishop Kallistos Ware and specialised in inter-faith dialogue, giving lectures in Birmingham. 
He was a theatre-designer, providing an "American Gothic" design for the first London revival of Stephen Sondheim's "Assassins" directed by Sam Buntrock He has travelled in Albania, Turkey and Greece drawing the views that Edward Lear first drew in 1848. His work is recorded in the Albanian Encyclopedia of Art. In 2016, he became a professor in the Moscow State Pedagogical University where he had previously lectured.

Politics
Wilson was selected as UKIP's candidate for South Northamptonshire at the 2015 general election. However, he resigned from UKIP on 24 March in support of Humza Yousaf  who said he was upset when David Coburn the only UKIP MEP in Scotland allegedly referred to Yousaf as the terrorist Abu Hamza. In his resignation letter, Tim Wilson made it clear that he believed Nigel Farage, the leader of UKIP had shown poor judgement in dismissing Coburn's alleged remarks as a "a joke in very poor taste. He would not be taking any action against him". Wilson later made the point that a joke should be funny and that linking Humza Yousaf to convicted terrorist Abu Hamza was not funny. Wilson is reported saying, "If Mr Coburn wants to make bad jokes about religion, then he is welcome to quit and join Monty Python.". "You can’t toss this thing off as a joke with a pint of beer. It's unacceptable."
As an animator, Wilson had made films for the UKIP campaign, UKIP's apparent response has been to accuse Wilson of not being interested in local affairs, a claim he denies in the Daventry Express, and by standing for election as a local Councillor.

While taking part in The Circle, Wilson claimed he actually voted to Remain and wished to "expose UKIP from the inside".
In September 2021, Tim Wilson was diagnosed with cancer. When he suffered a relapse, his co-star Woody Cook, son of Fat Boy Slim and Zoe Ball, wrote “He is a blessing to my life and to this world and he truly deserves the recognition and fast recovery. I love you Tim! xxx”

Television
In September 2019, Wilson began appearing as a contestant in the second series of the Channel 4 reality series The Circle. He was a finalist, placed joint third in the series. He also won the shows "Viewers' Champion" title for being the most popular finalist by viewer's vote, winning a £30,000 prize. Since leaving the show, Wilson has been vocal in calling on the Government for change in the way reality television programmes are made.

Awards
In 2012, Wilson won Best Animation at the Reed.co.uk Short Film Competition for How to be Boss.

References

1961 births
Living people
Alumni of St Benet's Hall, Oxford
British animators
UK Independence Party politicians
Gay politicians
LGBT animators
English LGBT politicians
Participants in British reality television series